The 1980 Rose Bowl was It was the 66th edition of the college football bowl game,  played on Tuesday, January 1, at the Rose Bowl in Pasadena, California. The USC Trojans, champions of the Pacific-10 Conference, defeated the Ohio State Buckeyes, champions of the Big Ten Conference, 17–16.

USC's Heisman Trophy running back Charles White was named the  Player of the Game (for a second time, having shared the previous game's award with Rick Leach), rushing for a record 247 yards, including the game-winning touchdown with little more than a minute remaining in the contest.

Ohio State went into the game with an 11–0 record, and was one of two undefeated and untied teams in the nation, along with Alabama. Had the Buckeyes won the game, they would have likely won at least a share of the national championship, as they were ranked first in the AP Poll at kickoff.

The game received a 28.6 Nielsen Rating, making it one of the highest-rated college football games of all time.

USC, having suffered a shocking 21–21 tie with Stanford (a home game in which they led 21–0 at halftime) that cost them the #1 ranking in mid-October, was runner-up in both final polls, behind Alabama.

This was the sixth consecutive Rose Bowl win for the Pac-10, with ten wins in the last eleven.

Scoring
First quarter 
USC – Eric Hipp 41-yard field goal
Second quarter
USC – Kevin Williams 53-yard pass from Paul McDonald (Hipp kick)
OSU – Vlade Janakievski 35-yard field goal
OSU – Gary Williams 67-yard pass from Art Schlichter (Janakievski kick)
Third quarter
OSU – Janakievski 37-yard field goal
Fourth quarter 
OSU – Janakievski, 24-yard field goal
USC – Charles White 1-yard run (Hipp kick)

References

Rose Bowl
Rose Bowl Game
Ohio State Buckeyes football bowl games
USC Trojans football bowl games
Rose Bowl
January 1980 sports events in the United States